Mohammad Hussein Tajik was the former commander of the Iranian Cyber Army, and a member of the Quds Force. He was detained and tortured following allegations that he leaked information to the Iranian Green Movement. He is believed to have been assassinated in his home.

References

Cyberwarfare in Iran
Assassinated Iranian people
Year of birth missing
Year of death missing